Cieplice  (Teplytsi) is a village in the administrative district of Gmina Adamówka, within Przeworsk County, Subcarpathian Voivodeship, in south-eastern Poland.

The village has a population of 740.

References

Villages in Przeworsk County